Wesel is a city in North Rhine-Westphalia, Germany. It is the capital of the Wesel district.

Geography
Wesel is situated at the confluence of the Lippe River and the Rhine.

Division of the city
Suburbs of Wesel include Lackhausen, Obrighoven, Ginderich, Feldmark, Fusternberg, Büderich, Flüren and Blumenkamp.

History

Origin
The city originated from a Franconian manor that was first recorded in the 8th century.
In the 12th century, the Duke of Clèves took possession of Wesel. The city became a member of the Hanseatic League during the 15th century. Wesel was second only to Cologne in the lower Rhine region as an entrepôt. It was an important commercial centre: a clearing station for the transshipment and trading of goods.

Early modern

In 1590 the Spanish captured Wesel after a four-year siege. The city changed hands between the Dutch and Spanish several times during the Eighty Years War. In 1672 a French force under Louis II de Bourbon, Prince de Condé captured the city. Wesel was inherited by the Hohenzollerns of the Margraviate of Brandenburg in 1609 but they were unable to take control of Wesel until the Treaty of Nijmegen in 1678. Although the city had been heavily fortified the Prussians evacuated the city during the Seven Years' War and it was occupied by the French. It was returned to Prussia at the end of the war. Friedrich Wilhelm von Dossow was the Prussian Governor of Wesel during the 18th century. Wesel was ceded to the French in 1805 under the Treaty of Schönbrunn. The French heavily fortified the city constructing a rectangular fort called the Citadelle Napoleon at Büderich and the Citadelle Bonaparte on an island in the Rhine off Wesel. Though blockaded by the Allies in 1813 the city remained in French hands until after the Battle of Waterloo. After the Napoleonic Wars of the early 19th century, the city became part of the Prussian Rhine Province and the Citadelle Napoleon was renamed Fort Blücher.

World War II

During World War II, as a strategic depot, Wesel became a target of Allied bombing. On the 16, 17, 18 and 19 February 1945, the town was attacked with impact and air-burst bombs, which destroyed 97% of it. The Wehrmacht blew up bridges along the Rhine and Lippe to prevent Allied forces from advancing. The Wehrmacht also destroyed the 1,950m-long railway bridge, the last Rhine bridge remaining in German hands, on 10 March. On 23 March, Wesel came under the fire of over 3,000 guns when it was bombarded anew, in preparation for Operation Plunder. The shelling was assisted by a raid of RAF bombers and a larger raid that night. At 2100 hours on the 23rd, ten individual bombers each dropped a 10,000 kg bomb on Wesel. Before the town was finally taken by Allied troops, 97% of its structures were destroyed. In the ensuing attacks by Allied forces, the town was taken with minimal casualties. Operation Varsity the largest airborne landings of the war dropped 18,000 troops into the area to take the hills behind Wesel. The British 1st Commando Brigade was already attacking Wesel, carried into action by LVT Buffalos. The remainder of the Allied force crossed the Rhine in more amphibious vehicles.

From almost 25,000 in 1939, the population was reduced to 1,900 by May 1945.  In 1946 Wesel became part of the new state North Rhine-Westphalia of West Germany.

Politics
Wesel's mayors:
 1808–1814: Johann Hermann Westermann
 1814–1840: Christian Adolphi
 1841–1862: Franz Luck
 1863–1870: Wilhelm Otto van Calker
 1870–1873: Heinrich Bang
 1873–1881: Carl Friedrich August von Albert
 1881–1891: Caspar Baur
 1891–1902: Josef Fluthgraf (1896 Oberbürgermeister)
 1903–1931: Ludwig Poppelbaum
 1931–1933: Emil Nohl
 1933–1945: Otto Borgers

Since 1945:
 1945: Jean Groos
 1945: Wilhelm Groos
 1946–1947: Anton Ebert (CDU)
 1947–1948: Paul Körner (CDU)
 1948–1952: Ewald Fournell (CDU)
 1952–1956: Helmut Berckel (CDU)
 1956–1966: Kurt Kräcker (SPD)
 1967–1969: Willi Nakaten (SPD)
 1969–1979: Günther Detert (CDU)
 1979–1984: Wilhelm Schneider (SPD)
 1984–1989: Volker Haubitz (CDU)
 1989–1994: Wilhelm Schneider (SPD)
 1994–1999: Bernhard Gründken (SPD)
 1999–2004: Jörn Schroh (CDU)
 since 2004: Ulrike Westkamp (SPD)

Twin towns – sister cities

Wesel is twinned with:
 Hagerstown, United States (1952)
 Felixstowe, England (1972)
 Salzwedel, Germany (1990)
 Kętrzyn, Poland (2002)

Transport
There is a railway station in the city centre as well as Wesel-Feldmark, about 2 km north. The stations are served by trains to Oberhausen, Duisburg, Düsseldorf, Cologne, Arnhem (Netherlands), and Mönchengladbach. A small diesel-only connecting railway line goes to Bocholt also, there are plans to electrify it.

Buildings and places of interest
 Berliner Tor, city gate
 Willibrordi-Dom (Cathedral). Commemorative plaque for Peter Minuit, Gründer von New York (founder of New York)
 Zitadelle Wesel (Citadel)
 Restored 15th century city hall
 Broadcasting Mast Wesel, one of Germany's tallest constructions
 Niederrheinbrücke Wesel, modern Rhine bridge opened in 2009
 Auesee, an artificial bathing lake

Notable people

Derick Baegert (1440–after 1509), painter
 Andreas Wytinck van Wesel, or Andreas Vesalius, anatomist, imperial physician to the court of Emperor Charles V
Jan Joest (1455–1519), painter
Hermann Wesel († 1563), last Bishop of Dorpat
Hans Lippershey (1550–1619), eyeglass maker associated with the invention of the telescope
Peregrine Bertie, 13th Baron Willoughby de Eresby (1555–1601), English diplomat and soldier
Carl Philipp, Reichsgraf von Wylich und Lottum (1650–1719), Prussian field marshal
Peter Minuit (1594–1638), founder of New Amsterdam, which later became New York City
Johann Friedrich Welsch (1796–1871), painter
Konrad Duden (1829–1911), author of the first Duden
Ludwig Hugo Becker (1833–1868), painter
Friedrich Geselschap (1835–1898), painter
Richard Veenfliet (1843–1922), painter and soldier
Ida Tacke (1896–1978), co-discoverer of the chemical elements rhenium and technetium
Joachim von Ribbentrop (1893–1946), foreign minister of Nazi Germany (1938–1945)
Jan Hofer (born 1950), journalist and television presenter
Dieter Nuhr (born 1960), comedian
Martin Bambauer (born 1970), church musician

Miscellaneous
One of Germany's highest radio masts is situated in the district of Büderich on the left bank of the Rhine. The Wesel transmitter measures 320.8 metres in height.

See also
Wesel Railway Bridge

References

Books

 Jutta Prieur (Hrsg.): Geschichte der Stadt Wesel: Beiträge zur Stadtgeschichte der frühen Neuzeit (= Studien und Quellen zur Geschichte von Wesel 20). Stadtarchiv, Wesel 1998, 
 Daniel Vasta (Hrsg.): Wesel Hansestadt am Niederrhein: Beiträge zum zeitgenössischen Geschehen (= Bilder von Menschen, Land und Leuten, Wesel 2009). Sutton Verlag, Wesel 2009, 
 Martin W. Roelen (Hrsg.): Ecclesia Wesele: Beiträge zur Ortsnamenforschung und Kirchengeschichte (= Studien und Quellen zur Geschichte von Wesel 28). Stadtarchiv, Wesel 2005,

External links

 

 
Members of the Hanseatic League
Districts of the Rhine Province
Towns in North Rhine-Westphalia
Populated places on the Rhine
Wesel (district)